ingenhoven associates is an architectural firm based in Düsseldorf, Germany. The office was founded in 1985 by Christoph Ingenhoven and became notable for its ecologically oriented designs for high-rise buildings. Former names of the company were Ingenhoven Overdiek and Partner and ingenhoven architects.

Design
ingenhoven associates designed the RWE Tower in Essen (1991–96), a naturally ventilated double-skin facade high-rise building. Other low-energy office buildings by the office are the Lufthansa Headquarters in Frankfurt (2006), the European Investment Bank in Luxembourg (2008), the Breezé Tower in Osaka (2008), 1 Bligh Street building in Sydney (2006–11) and the Marina One complex in Singapore.

Projects (selection) 

 1997 RWE Tower Essen
 2000 HQ Stadtsparkasse Düsseldorf
 2008 Lufthansa Aviation Center Frankfurt 
 2011 1 Bligh Sydney 
 2017 Marina One Singapore
 2021 Kö-Bogen II Düsseldorf
 2022 Lanserhof Sylt

Awards (selection) 

 2006 Global Holcim Awards for Sustainable Construction Gold for Stuttgart Main Station
 2009 RIBA International Award for the European Investment Bank 
 2010 Emilio Ambasz Award for Green Architecture for European Investment Bank
 2012 International High-Rise Award for 1 Bligh 
 2012 CTBUH Best Tall Building Award for 1 Bligh 
 2015 German Design Award, Architecture & Urban Space for Swarovski HQ Lake Zurich
 2015 Green Good Design Award for Lanserhof Lake Tegern 
 2015 WAF Awards, Hotel & Leisure for Lanserhof Lake Tegern
 2018 MIPIM Awards, Best innovative Green Building for Marina One 
 2018 MIPIM Asia Awards, Best Innovative Green Building for Marina One 
 2019 MIPIM AR Future Projects Award for 505 George Street Sydney
 2021 CTBUH 10 Year Award for Excellence for 1 Bligh
 2021 Iconic Awards Best of Best Kö-Bogen II
 2021 Prix Versailles for Kö-Bogen II
 2022 European Prize for Architecture 
 2023 MIPIM Awards, Best Hospitality, Leisure and Tourism for Lanserhof Sylt

Further reading
a+u 2015:08 (539) ingenhoven architects - supergreen
Binet, Helene: Ingenhoven Overdiek and Partner: Energies, Birkhäuser, Basel, 2002

External links
official website

References

Architecture firms of Germany
Companies based in Düsseldorf
21st-century German architects
Design companies established in 1985
1985 establishments in Germany